Godunov is a Russian surname.

Godunov can refer to the following:

 Two Tsars of Russia and their kin:
 Tsar Boris Fyodorovich Godunov a regent of Russia from 1584 to 1598 and then tsar from 1598 to 1605
 Tsar Fyodor Borisovich Godunov son of Tsar Boris Godunov, ruled less than a year as Feodor II after his father's death in 1605; murdered in June the same year
 Xenia Borisovna Godunova (later the Nun Olga) daughter of Tsar Boris Godunov
 Irina Feodorovna Godunova (later the Nun Alexandra) wife of Tsar Feodor I Ivanovich and sister of Tsar Boris Godunov
 Sergei Konstantinovich Godunov, a Russian born mathematician who contributed to Finite volume method
 Godunov's scheme, a mathematical method invented by the above
 Aleksandr Borisovich Godunov was a Russian ballet dancer and actor
 Petr Ivanovich Godunov a Siberian governor
 Godunov map created by the above
Godunov (TV series) Russian television drama

Surnames
Russian-language surnames